Elections to South Lanarkshire Council took place on 5 May 2022 on the same day as the 31 other Scottish local government elections.

For the second consecutive election, the Scottish National Party were returned with the most seats at 27 but remained shy of an overall majority. Labour made small gains to again finish second with an increased number of members with 24 – up two from 2017 – while the Conservatives lost half their number to return seven members. The Liberal Democrats and independents both made two gains to return three and two members respectively while the Greens won their first ever seat in South Lanarkshire.

On 18 May, Labour and the Lib Dems announced that they would run the council as a coalition, alongside one independent councillor, with support from the Conservatives.

Background

Previous election

At the previous election in 2017, the Scottish National Party (SNP) won the most seats for the first time. Labour had won every previous election in South Lanarkshire following the local government reforms in the 1990s. The SNP gained one seat to hold 27, six shy of an overall majority, while Labour lost 10 seats which left them with 22. The Conservatives gained 10 seats to record their best result in a South Lanarkshire election with 14 while the Liberal Democrats held their only seat.

Source:

Electoral system
The election used the 20 wards created under the Local Governance (Scotland) Act 2004, with 64 councillors being elected. Each ward elected either 3 or 4 members, using the STV electoral system where candidates are ranked in order of preference.

Composition
Several changes in the composition of the council occurred between the 2017 and 2022 elections. Most were changes to the political affiliation of councillors including SNP councillors Sheena Wardhaugh, Jim Wardhaugh and David Watson and Labour councillors Margaret Cooper, Joe Lowe and George Greenshields who resigned from their respective parties to become independents. Conservative councillor Mark McGeever and Labour councillor Fiona Dryburgh switched allegiances to the Liberal Democrats. Conservative councillor Colin McGavigan was initially suspended before resigning from the party and Labour councillor Jackie Burns was expelled from the party. Two by-elections resulted in a Labour hold and an SNP hold.

Retiring councillors

Source:

Candidates
The total number of candidates fell from 152 in 2017 to 143. As was the case five years previous, the SNP fielded the highest number of candidates at 37 across the 20 wards. Both Labour and the Conservatives also fielded at least one candidate in every ward but the 30 candidates fielded by Labour was two less than in 2017 whereas the Conservatives maintained a total of 21 candidates. Unlike the previous election, the Liberal Democrats did not contest every ward after only 16 candidates were selected. The Greens had contested 19 of the 20 wards in 2017 but only contested 14 this time. The number of independent candidates increased from nine in 2017 to 11 but the UK Independence Party (UKIP) only fielded half as many candidates (four). For the first time, the Scottish Family Party, the Scottish Libertarian Party and the Alba Party fielded candidates in a South Lanarkshire election. For only the second time since 1999, the Scottish Socialist Party did not field any candidates and for the first time since 2003 neither Solidarity nor the Scottish Unionist Party fielded any candidates either.

Controversies
Larkhall councillor Jackie Burns was criticised after announcing he would be standing for re-election. In June 2021, Cllr Burns was cleared of sexual assault but was called a "nuisance drunk" by a Sheriff before being banned from public transport for pestering a woman on a bus. In 2016, Cllr Burns was convicted of a similar offence involving a 17-year-old girl and was previously fined for public urination. Prior to the 2017 election, Cllr Burns was expelled from the Labour party after he had been nominated as a candidate by the party following a conviction for breach of the peace.

Scottish Family Party candidates in Lanarkshire were accused of "extremist right wing views" by advocacy group Hope not Hate for their policies on transgender rights and hate speech legislation. The party is considered anti-LGBT but claims to be pro-free speech.

Results

Source: 

Note: Votes are the sum of first preference votes across all council wards. The net gain/loss and percentage changes relate to the result of the previous Scottish local elections on 4 May 2017. This is because STV has an element of proportionality which is not present unless multiple seats are being elected. This may differ from other published sources showing gain/loss relative to seats held at the dissolution of Scotland's councils.

Ward summary

|- class="unsortable" align="centre"
!rowspan="2" align="left"|Ward
! %
!Cllrs
! %
!Cllrs
! %
!Cllrs
! %
!Cllrs
! %
!Cllrs
! %
!Cllrs
!rowspan="2"|TotalCllrs
|- class="unsortable" align="center"
!colspan="2"|SNP
!colspan="2"|Lab
!colspan="2"|Con
!colspan="2"|Lib Dem
!colspan="2"|Green
!colspan="2"|Others
|-
|align="left"|Clydesdale West
|32.7
|1
|bgcolor="#eea2ad"|38.2
|bgcolor="#eea2ad"|2
|23.6
|1
|2.4
|0
|3.1
|0
|colspan="2" 
|4
|-
|align="left"|Clydesdale North
|33.4
|1
|bgcolor="#eea2ad"|33.8
|bgcolor="#eea2ad"|1
|26.9
|1
|colspan="2" 
|colspan="2" 
|6.0
|0
|3
|-
|align="left"|Clydesdale East
|33.5
|1
|16.4
|1
|bgcolor="#add8e6"|40.8
|bgcolor="#add8e6"|1
|3.1
|0
|5.3
|0
|0.9
|0
|3
|-
|align="left"|Clydesdale South
|bgcolor="#efe146"|33.5
|bgcolor="#efe146"|1
|25.9
|1
|18.7
|1
|colspan="2" 
|3.1
|0
|18.8
|0
|3
|-
|align="left"|Avondale and Stonehouse
|bgcolor="#efe146"|28.4
|bgcolor="#efe146"|1
|19.8
|1
|20.6
|0
|colspan="2" 
|6.4
|0
|24.8
|1
|3
|-
|align="left"|East Kilbride South
|bgcolor="#efe146"|48.7
|bgcolor="#efe146"|2
|23.0
|1
|8.7
|0
|13.7
|0
|2.9
|0
|3.0
|0
|3
|-
|align="left"|East Kilbride Central South
|bgcolor="#efe146"|43.9
|bgcolor="#efe146"|2
|38.6
|1
|9.1
|0
|2.7
|0
|3.9
|0
|1.9
|0
|3
|-
|align="left"|East Kilbride Central North
|bgcolor="#efe146"|43.8
|bgcolor="#efe146"|2
|37.3
|1
|12.2
|0
|3.3
|0
|colspan="2" 
|3.4
|0
|3
|-
|align="left"|East Kilbride West
|bgcolor="#efe146"|30.9
|bgcolor="#efe146"|1
|26.5
|1
|20.0
|0
|2.1
|0
|colspan="2" 
|20.5
|1
|3
|-
|align="left"|East Kilbride East
|bgcolor="#efe146"|37.4
|bgcolor="#efe146"|1
|27.0
|1
|13.5
|0
|2.6
|0
|12.7
|1
|6.8
|0
|3
|-
|align="left"|Rutherglen South
|bgcolor="#efe146"|31.9
|bgcolor="#efe146"|1
|23.2
|1
|8.5
|0
|29.4
|1
|4.6
|0
|2.4
|0
|3
|-
|align="left"|Rutherglen Central and North
|bgcolor="#efe146"|37.7
|bgcolor="#efe146"|2
|35.0
|1
|12.0
|0
|10.2
|0
|5.1
|0
|colspan="2" 
|3
|-
|align="left"|Cambuslang West
|bgcolor="#efe146"|39.0
|bgcolor="#efe146"|1
|30.1
|1
|12.9
|0
|12.7
|1
|5.2
|0
|colspan="2" 
|3
|-
|align="left"|Cambuslang East
|bgcolor="#efe146"|42.3
|bgcolor="#efe146"|2
|39.4
|1
|9.6
|0
|2.9
|0
|4.0
|0
|1.8
|0
|3
|-
|align="left"|Blantyre
|42.1
|1
|bgcolor="#eea2ad"|44.8
|bgcolor="#eea2ad"|2
|7.7
|0
|2.1
|0
|3.2
|0
|colspan="2" 
|3
|-
|align="left"|Bothwell and Uddingston
|bgcolor="#efe146"|32.2
|bgcolor="#efe146"|1
|30.3
|1
|27.6
|1
|5.3
|0
|4.5
|0
|colspan="2" 
|3
|-
|align="left"|Hamilton North and East
|bgcolor="#efe146"|40.8
|bgcolor="#efe146"|1
|32.4
|1
|19.0
|1
|5.2
|0
|colspan="2" 
|2.6
|0
|3
|-
|align="left"|Hamilton West and Earnock
|bgcolor="#efe146"|41.4
|bgcolor="#efe146"|2
|30.7
|1
|12.9
|0
|11.9
|1
|3.1
|0
|colspan="2" 
|4
|-
|align="left"|Hamilton South
|41.4
|2
|bgcolor="#eea2ad"|45.4
|bgcolor="#eea2ad"|2
|13.1
|0
|colspan="2" 
|colspan="2" 
|colspan="2" 
|4
|-
|align="left"|Larkhall
|28.9
|1
|bgcolor="#eea2ad"|33.0
|bgcolor="#eea2ad"|2
|24.5
|1
|2.4
|0
|colspan="2" 
|11.2
|0
|4
|- class="unsortable" class="sortbottom"
!align="left"| Total
!36.9
!27
!31.7
!24
!17.3
!7
!5.4
!3
!3.2
!1
!5.6
!2
!64
|}

Source:

Seats changing hands
Below is a list of seats which elected a different party or parties from 2017 in order to highlight the change in political composition of the council from the previous election. The list does not include defeated incumbents who resigned or defected from their party and subsequently failed re-election while the party held the seat.

Notes

Ward results

Clydesdale West
Labour (2), the SNP (1) and the Conservatives (1) held the seats they won at the last election.

Clydesdale North
Labour, the SNP and the Conservatives held the seats they won at the previous election.

Clydesdale East
The Conservatives held one of their two seats while the SNP held their only seat and Labour gained one seat from the Conservatives.

Clydesdale South
The SNP, Labour and the Conservatives held the seats they won at the previous election. Independent candidates George Greenshields and Colin McGavigan were elected as Labour and Conservative candidates respectively in 2017 but later resigned from their respective parties.

Avondale and Stonehouse
The SNP and Labour held the seats they won at the previous election while the Conservatives lost their only seat to an independent candidate. In 2017, Cllr Margaret Cooper was elected as a Labour candidate but later resigned from the party. She was re-elected as an independent candidate.

East Kilbride South
The SNP (2) and Labour (1) held the seats they won in the previous election.

East Kilbride Central South
The SNP (2) and Labour (1) held the seats they won at the previous election.

East Kilbride Central North
The SNP (2) and Labour (1) held the seats they won at the previous election.

East Kilbride West
The SNP and Labour held the seats they won at the previous election while the Conservatives lost their only seat to an independent candidate. In 2017, Cllr David Watson was elected as an SNP candidate but later resigned from the party. He was re-elected as an independent candidate.

East Kilbride East
The SNP held one of the two seats they won at the previous election while Labour held their only seat and the Greens gained one. Independent candidate Jim Wardhaugh was elected as an SNP candidate in 2017 but later resigned from the party.

Rutherglen South
The SNP, the Liberal Democrats and Labour held the seats they won at the previous election.

Rutherglen Central and North
The SNP and Labour held the seats they won at the previous election and the SNP gained one seat from the Conservatives.

Cambuslang West
The SNP and Labour held the seats they won at the previous election and the Liberal Democrats gained one seat from the Conservatives.

Cambuslang East
The SNP (2) and Labour (1) held the seats they won at the previous election.

Blantyre
Labour (2) and the SNP (1) held the seats they won at the previous election.

Bothwell and Uddingston
The SNP, Labour and the Conservatives held the seats they won at the previous election.

Hamilton North and East
The SNP, Labour and the Conservatives held the seats they won at the previous election.

Hamilton West and Earnock
The SNP (2) and Labour (1) held the seats they had won at the previous election while the Liberal Democrats gained one seat from the Conservatives. In 2017, Cllr Mark McGeever was elected as a Conservative candidate but he subsequently defected to the Liberal Democrats. He was re-elected as a Liberal Democrat candidate.

Hamilton South
The SNP held both their seats while Labour held one and gained one from the Conservatives.

Larkhall
Labour (2), the SNP (1) and the Conservatives (1) held the seats they won at the previous election. Independent candidate Jackie Burns was elected as a Labour candidate in 2017 but was later expelled from the party.

Aftermath
Despite having again been returned as the largest party, the outgoing SNP administration was replaced by a coalition of Labour, Liberal Democrat and independent councillors, with Conservative support. Labour group leader Joe Fagan and depute group leader Gerry Convery were elected as leader of the council and depute leader of the council respectively. SNP group leader John Ross, who was leader of the council from 2017 until the 2022 election, said the council had been "hijacked by a unionist pact". Outgoing Provost Ian McAllan was replaced by independent councillor Margaret Cooper and Cllr Bert Thomson was elected Depute Provost to fill the vacancy created when former Depute Provost Collette Stevenson stood down following her election as MSP for East Kilbride.

The Labour group were accused of "teaming up with the Tories" by Rutherglen MSP Clare Haughey, whilst Clydesdale MSP Màiri McAllan said the coalition was a "sad day for democracy". The Conservative group admitted they had voted in a unionist manner but denied there was any formal agreement between them and the other unionist parties.

References

South Lanarkshire Council elections
South Lanarkshire
21st century in South Lanarkshire